Where Lovers Mourn is the debut full-length album released by the band Draconian through Napalm Records on the 20 October 2003. It was recorded and produced at Studio Mega by Chris Silver and Draconian in June 2003.

Most of the songs in this album are new and enhanced versions for songs Draconian had previously written for its demos and EPs, mainly for "Dark Oceans We Cry" and "Frozen Features".

The first song, "The Cry of Silence", is the longest on the album, and features a choir, along with Anders' growlings (main singing style), speech and Lisa's vocals. It describes a misanthropic man who wishes to live away from all others and "die in silence", a theme which is also present in "The Solitude".

Track listing
All songs were written by Anders Jacobsson and Johan Ericson, except where noted.

Personnel
Anders Jacobsson – vocals
Lisa Johansson – vocals
Johan Ericson – lead guitar, rhythm guitar
Magnus Bergström – rhythm guitar
Thomas Jäger – bass
Anders Karlsson – programming, synthesizer
Jerry Torstensson – drums, guitar on "Akherousia", percussion

Additional personnel
Olof Götlin – violin
Christophe Szpajdel - logo, typography
Maya Hallström - photography (band)
Thomas Färngren - mastering
Manne Engström - engineering (assistant)
Henrik Lyknert - engineering (assistant)
Chris Silver - producer, engineering, mastering
Travis Smith - cover art, layout
Susanne Arvidsson - lyrics for "The Solitude"

References

2003 debut albums
Draconian (band) albums
Death-doom albums
Napalm Records albums
Albums with cover art by Travis Smith (artist)